Majakka is a high-rise building in Kalasatama, Helsinki.
It is divided into 35 floors, and contains 283 residences. The 5th floor has a garden open to the public. The tower is conjoined with the Redi shopping centre and the Kalasatama metro station. The complex will include 7 other residential towers, as well as a hotel and offices.

After delays related to water damage, the first tenants moved in on November 25th, 2019.

Sources 
 The REDI Complex – Finland’s largest construction project - Structurae
 Residents will move into Majakka, peak of the inner city, in summer 2019 - SRV.fi - 10/25/2018 – Company news

Notes

References 

Buildings and structures in Helsinki